Bely Yar is an urban locality (an urban-type settlement) in Verkhneketsky District of Tomsk Oblast, Russia. Population:

References

Urban-type settlements in Tomsk Oblast